Sara Vietnam Joint Stock Company (SRA:VN, SRB:VN; also transliterated Sara Viet Nam; also known as Sara Group) is an information technology company of Vietnam.  It has its origins in 2002 with the founding of the SARA Center, a learning center that teaches information technology and foreign language skills, which currently graduates 2000 people per year. The company is based in Hanoi and is listed at the Hanoi Securities Trading Center, one of Vietnam's two major stock markets.

Operations
The company's primary activities include of information technology research and software development, including business software for e-commerce, accounting, procurement, human resources, customer service, industrial production technology and hospital management.  Sara Vietnam is also working in the media, education and real estate fields.

According to its website, the overall work of the company is divided into four "Fields of action":

Software
Media, including television programming.
Instruction; the company offers a Bachelor's Degree program in information technology, and foreign language training.
Real estate development and management, and building construction including 'Commercial Center' in Vinh City, 'Software Park' in Hà Tây, 'North Central Trade Centre'  in Ha Noi, the 'Boris Smirnov Wine Factory', and a plastic factory.

In addition to the "Four fields", the company is involved in Sara Window, a constructions materials manufacturing company that makes windows, doors and room partitions.

Sara Vietnam conducts a feasibility study on the possibilities of mobile marketing in Vietnam, supported by the Danish B2B Programme.

Professional associations
Sara Vietnam is a member of the Vietnam Software Association (VINASA); the South East Asia Scientific Association; and the Vietnam Chamber of Commerce and Industry (VCCI).

University
The company's management and education departments are working with the Ministry of Education towards the opening of SIBT University (Sara International Business Technology University), in Lai Châu Province of the Vietnamese northwest.

Shareholders
Sara Vietnam is a publicly traded company. 15% of shares is owned by Japanese CPR International. It was the first Japanese investment into a Vietnamese private company.

References

External links
Sara Vietnam JSC

Companies established in 2002
Companies listed on the Hanoi Stock Exchange
Companies based in Hanoi
Information technology companies of Vietnam